Russia Day called Day of adoption of the declaration of state sovereignty of RSFSR before 2002, is the national holiday of the Russian Federation. It has been celebrated annually on 12 June since 1992. The day commemorates the adoption of the Declaration of State Sovereignty of the Russian Soviet Federative Socialist Republic (RSFSR) on 12 June 1990. The passage of this Declaration by the First Congress of People's Deputies marked the beginning of constitutional reform in the Russian Soviet state.

History

With the creation of the post of the President of the Russian Federation and the adoption of the new Russian Constitution to reflect the new political reality, the national flag, anthem, and emblem of the Russian Federation were major landmarks in the consolidation of Russian statehood. The country's new name, the Russian Federation, was adopted on December 25, 1991. In 1992, the Supreme Soviet of Russia proclaimed June 12 as a national holiday. By presidential decree on June 2, 1994, the date was again proclaimed Russia's national holiday. Under a subsequent presidential decree on June 16, 1998, the holiday was officially named "Russia Day". In 2002, the new Labour Code gave its official seal to this title.

Russian attitudes towards this holiday are ambivalent. According to the Fund "Public Opinion", June 12 is considered a holiday by 45% of Russians. It is noteworthy that the number of citizens who perceive this day as a holiday increased substantially over time. For example, in 2005 only 15% of Russians called it a holiday, and 29% did in 2014. At the same time, the number of people who receive the day off from work has declined: In 2005 the figure was 73%, in 2014 it was 60%, and by 2015 it had fallen to 42%.

In 2019 the self-proclaimed Donetsk People's Republic proclaimed Russia Day a "state holiday".

For the 2020 celebrations in the city of Kirov, from June 1, 2020 a flash mob #WeRussia was launched, in which people can also take part. It is necessary to sing the anthem of the Russian Federation, having recorded this performance on video, and put it on social networks. From the first day of summer, you can participate in the Challenge #RussianRhymes: read video poems of Russian classics and publish on social networks. From June 5 to 12 the action “Windows of Russia” was taking place: decoration of windows, balconies and facades of residential buildings with symbols of our country. From June 8 to June 12, Kirov residents could join the “Welcome to Russia” and “Russia in the lens” promotions on the official pages of clubs in the community and centers of local activity. Challenges were held on the same dates: # Russian word - reading poems and excerpts from works of domestic writers and "I love you, Russia, I love you, Kirov", reading poems dedicated to the country and the city. On the same dates one could participate in the # Chitricolor Challenge.

Customs
People may attend concerts and fireworks that take place in many cities throughout the country. Prominent Russian writers, scientists and humanitarian workers receive State Awards from the President of Russia on this day. Most public offices and schools are closed on June 12. If the day falls on a weekend, the public holiday shifts to the following Monday.

However, many Russians see Russia Day only as a day off. As it commemorates the Soviet Union's dissolution, it brings back bitter memories for some. This is because the dissolution led to severe unemployment, high crime and poverty within Russia and other former Soviet republics.

In 2002, about 5000 representatives from across the country took part in the pageantry from Tverskaya Zastava to Manezh Square. The highlight of the Day of Russia-2003 was the air show, which included aerobatic teams "Russian Knights" and "Swifts".  Sukhoi and MiG planes left a trail forming the Russian flag. On June 12, 2004 at Red Square a historical military parade was held. Its members, soldiers of the Russian army and representatives of 89 regions, dressed in national costumes, presented the audience the most significant milestones of Russian history. In 2007 celebrations occurred in a hundreds of cities. For example, in Krasnoyarsk action thousands of people in white, blue and red robes formed more than a kilometer long tricolor.

Russia Day in 2008 was celebrated for three days from 11 to 14 June. In Tomsk a "Wooden Carnival" displayed a huge wooden Russian ruble, one hundred times the size of the coin. In Samara enthusiasts reconstructed forces of Minin and Pozharsky in 1612 with Polish–Muscovite War. In Moscow, the holiday included a three-hour concert and concluded a six-month contest over the "Seven Wonders of Russia". In Red Square 20 lines of stage pyrotechnics, confetti cannon in the colors of the Russian flag and 100 guns.

In 2009 residents of Volgograd formed a map of the country covering 127 square meters. In Sevastopol, youths passed through the city center carrying a 30-meter flag of Russia. In Moscow, at Revolution Square that day a two-meter Khokhloma doll was painted. For the first time at the Ostankino Tower the state flag was displayed.

Name
According to some surveys, many Russians think that this holiday is Russia's Independence Day, but the holiday has never had such a name in official documents. According to the survey of Levada Center in May 2003, 65 percent of the respondents named the holiday as the Independence Day of Russia.

References

External links

June observances
Public holidays in Russia
Public holidays in South Ossetia
National days
Summer events in Russia
1992 establishments in Russia
Annual events in Russia